is a private university in Ōta, Gunma, Japan, established in 1976.

External links
  Official website 

Educational institutions established in 1976
1976 establishments in Japan
Private universities and colleges in Japan
Universities and colleges in Gunma Prefecture
Ōta, Gunma